Since the independence of the United Arab Emirates from Britain in 1971, Egypt and the UAE relations were always at a good level and developing at an unprecedented rate. Egypt has an embassy in Abu Dhabi and consulate-general in Dubai while the UAE maintains an embassy in Cairo. The bond of friendship between the leaders of both countries has reflected on the growing political, economic and cultural ties between them, and as a result the UAE ranks first among Arab and foreign countries investing in Egypt. UAE and Egypt maintain a close economic ties and maintain trade between the two countries, with imports and exports between the two sides. The government of the UAE, by an order from Sheikh Khalifa bin Zayed Al Nahyan the President of UAE, gave Egypt cargo ships carrying 1,000,000 tonnes of wheat as a food gift to the people of Egypt. The UAE supported the 2013 Egyptian coup d'état and has since become Egypt's closest ally.

See also 
 Foreign relations of Egypt
 Foreign relations of the United Arab Emirates

References